Chinese Bridge (Chinese: 汉语桥) is a contest for foreign  students on their mastery of the Chinese language, promoted by the Chinese National Hanban and established as a plan to introduce Chinese to the world. Since it began in 2002, more than 600 contestants from over 50 countries throughout the world have participated in the annually-held Chinese language competitions.

There are three versions: , one for secondary school students outside of China, and one for non-Chinese students attending educational institutions in China. The first was established in 2002 and the second was established in 2008.

History

Notable people

Participants

In business and media 
Daniela Anahí Bessia: Celebrity, Singer, Actress and Chinese National Television host. (The Eighth Contest)

References

South Korean College Student Wins 2012 Chinese Bridge Competition
Chinese Bridge Competition

External links
Official website 
Chinese Bridge site by Hanban  

Bridge
Bridge
Bridge